This can refer to:
2010 Baltimore beating
2012 St. Patrick's Day beating
2011 Rosedale, Maryland beating